The 2009 Miami RedHawks football team represented Miami University during the 2010 NCAA Division I FBS football season  They competed in the Mid-American Conference (MAC) East Division. The team was coached by Mike Haywood and played their homes game in Yager Stadium. The Redhawks finished the season on November 18 with a record of 1–11 (1–7 MAC).

Before the season

Recruiting

Schedule

Roster

Coaching staff

Game summaries

Kentucky

Scoring Summary

1st Quarter

2nd Quarter
 11:28 UK Cobb 27-yard pass from Hartline (Seiber kick) 7-0 UK
 06:50 UK Locke 16-yard run (Seiber kick) 14-0 UK
 01:55 UK Matthews 21-yard pass from Hartline (Seiber kick) 21-0 UK

3rd Quarter
 11:30 UK Cobb 11-yard run (Seiber kick) 28-0 UK
 07:28 UK Lindley 25-yard interception return (Seiber kick) 35-0 UK

4th Quarter
 13:58 UK Allen 9-yard run (Seiber kick) 42-0 UK

Boise State

1st Quarter
 07:16 BSU- Austin Pettis 17 Yd Pass From Kellen Moore (Kyle Brotzman Kick) 0-7
 01:17 BSU- Tyler Shoemaker 15 Yd Pass From Kellen Moore (Kyle Brotzman Kick) 0-14

2nd Quarter
 00:08 BSU- Titus Young 25 Yd Pass From Kellen Moore (Pat Failed) 0-20

3rd Quarter
 07:09 BSU- D.J. Harper 3 Yd Run (Kyle Brotzman Kick) 0-27
 02:11 BSU- Titus Young 54 Yd Pass From Kellen Moore (Kyle Brotzman Kick) 0-34

4th Quarter
 09:46 BSU- Doug Martin 4 Yd Run (Kyle Brotzman Kick) 0-41
 01:56 BSU- Doug Martin 2 Yd Run (Jimmy Pavel Kick) 0-48

Western Michigan

Scoring Summary

1st Quarter
 14:53 WMU Berry 24-yard fumble recovery (Potter kick) 0-7 WMU
 09:29 WMU Nunez 10-yard pass from Hiller (Potter kick) 0-14 WMU

2nd Quarter
 13:53 WMU Hammond 1-yard pass from Hiller (Potter kick) 0-21 WMU
 02:07 WMU Nunez 16-yard pass from Hiller (Potter kick) 0-28 WMU

3rd Quarter
 09:37 WMU West 1-yard run (Potter kick) 0-35 WMU
 07:09 MIAMI Harris 14-yard pass from Raudabaugh (Cook kick blocked) 6-35 WMU
 04:36 WMU West 7-yard pass from Hiller (Potter kick) 6-42 WMU
 03:52 WMU Winchester 1-yard run (Potter kick failed) 6-48 WMU
 01:06 MIAMI Harris 42-yard pass from Raudabaugh (Green rush failed) 12-48 WMU

4th Quarter
 06:46 MIAMI Lawson 2-yard run (Cook kick) 19-48 WMU
 00:51 MIAMI Stevens 11-yard pass from Dysert (Cook kick) 26-47 WMU

Kent State

Scoring Summary

1st Quarter
 4:48 MIAMI Cook 28-yard field goal 3-0 MIAMI
 4:34 KENT Bowman 92-yard kickoff return (Cortez kick failed) 3-6 KENT

2nd Quarter
 13:18 KENT Archer 28-yard run (Cortez kick) 3-13 KENT
 7:49 KENT Cortez 37-yard field goal 3-16 KENT
 2:35 KENT Cortez 42-yard field goal 3-19 KENT
 0:04 MIAMI Rogers 9-yard pass from Dysert (Cook kick) 10-19 KENT

3rd Quarter
 5:54 KENT Konz 56-yard pass from Keith (Cortez kick) 10-26 KENT
 2:52 MIAMI Merriweather 1-yard run (Dysert pass failed) 16-26 KENT

4th Quarter
 1:19 Cortez 34-yard field goal 19-26 KENT

Cincinnati

Northwestern

Scoring Summary

1st Quarter
 12:20 NU Demos 46-yard field goal 0-3 NU
 00:05 NU Kafka 6-yard run (Demos kick) 0-10 NU

3rd Quarter
 01:18 NU Kafka 1-yard run (Demos pass intercepted) 0-16 NU

4th Quarter
 01:19 MIAMI Cruse 23-yard pass from Dysert (Dysert pass failed) 6-16 NU

Ohio

Northern Illinois

Scoring Summary

1st Quarter
 8:01 NIU Spann 42-yard run (Salerno kick) 7-0 NIU
 5:05 NIU Salerno 44-yard field goal 10-0 NIU
 2:42 NIU Ashford 44-yard punt return (Salerno kick) 17-0 NIU

2nd Quarter
 0:35 MIAMI Robinson 14-yard pass from Dysert (Cook kick) 17-7 NIU

4th Quarter
 12:49 MIAMI Cook 32-yard field goal 17-10 NIU
 6:14 NIU Salerno 25-yard field goal 20-10 NIU
 1:58 MIAMI Rogers 4-yard pass from Dysert (Cook kick blocked) 20-16 NIU
 0:58 NIU Spann 40-yard run (Salerno kick) 27-16 NIU
 0:00 MIAMI Robinson 24-yard pass from Dysert 27-22 NIU

Toledo

Scoring Summary

1st Quarter
 10:55 MIAMI Williams 20-yard interception return (Cook kick) 0-7 MIAMI
 0:44 TOLEDO Collins 1-yard run (Steigerwald kick) 7-7

2nd Quarter
 13:14 MIAMI Cruse 10-yard pass from Dysert (Cook kick) 7-14 MIAMI
 7:04 MIAMI Dysert 3-yard run (Cook kick) 7-21 MIAMI
 0:37 MIAMI Cook 55-yard field goal 7-24 MIAMI

3rd Quarter
 12:55 TOLEDO Page 14-yard pass from Opelt (Steigerwald kick) 14-24 MIAMI
 7:09 TOLEDO Steigerwald 26-yard field goal 17-24 MIAMI
 3:47 MIAMI Dysert 23-yard run (Cook kick) 17-31 MIAMI
 0:31 TOLEDO Page 15-yard run (Steigerwald kick) 24-31 MIAMI

Temple

Bowling Green

Buffalo

References

Miami
Miami RedHawks football seasons
Miami RedHawks football